187th Regiment may refer to: 

 187th Infantry Regiment (United States)
 187th New York Volunteer Infantry
 187th Ohio Infantry
 187th Paratroopers Regiment "Folgore"